Thomas (the Tank Engine) & Friends is a children's television series about the engines and other characters working on the railways of the Island of Sodor, and is based on The Railway Series books written by the Reverend W. Awdry.

This article lists and details episodes from the third series of the show, which was first broadcast in the UK between 25 February and 14 July 1992, and in the United States as part of Shining Time Station in November 1991 (shortly after being released direct-to-video in the UK). In 1993, the last ten episodes were released in the United States on Shining Time Station. This series was narrated by Michael Angelis for UK audiences, while George Carlin narrated the episodes for US audiences.

Some episodes in this series have one title: the original from the American titles are shown underneath.

In the US, this season was aired from 18 November 1991 to 7 June 1993 on Shining Time Station.

On episodes 1–16, the UK narration uses a different take on the TV broadcast compared to the original VHS releases.

Production

Filming 
Series 3 was produced by The Britt Allcroft Company in association with Japanese television station Fuji Television. It was divided into two parts, one part having 16 episodes and the other having ten. The series was filmed and produced in 1991. 16 episodes were released direct-to-video on November 11, 1991 in the UK, and aired in the United States from November 18 to December 27, 1991 as part of Shining Time Station. They remained unaired in the UK until February 25, 1992, when the full series aired there. The last ten episodes aired on Shining Time Station in 1993. It was made at a cost of £1,300,000.
Before production of series 3, Clearwater Features closed down, with The Britt Allcroft Company becoming the sole producer. Producer Robert D. Cardona left before series 3, and Britt Allcroft took his place as co-producer alongside David Mitton.

Stories 
The series was a combination of episodes derived from The Railway Series, stories in the Thomas the Tank Engine & Friends magazines (written by Andrew Brenner, the show's head writer from 2013 to 2018) (uncredited), and a couple of original stories by Allcroft and Mitton. One of the primary reasons for diverging from the original books was that many of the stories not yet used featured large numbers of new characters, which would be expensive to produce. Another was that the producers wanted more stories about Thomas, the nominal main character. Awdry complained that the new stories would be unrealistic (see Henry the Green Engine for more details).

Episodes

Characters

Introduced
 Oliver ("Escape!")
 Mavis ("Mavis")
 The Chinese Dragon ("Thomas, Percy & the Dragon")
 Bulgy ("Bulgy")
 Farmer Trotter ("Bulgy") (not named)
 Flying Scotsman ("Tender Engines") (tenders only; does not speak)
 Toad ("Escape!") (does not speak)
 City of Truro ("Gordon & the Famous Visitor") (not named; does not speak)

Recurring cast

 Thomas
 Edward
 Henry
 Gordon
 James
 Percy
 Toby
 Duck
 Donald and Douglas
 Bill and Ben
 Diesel
 BoCo
 Annie and Clarabel
 Troublesome Trucks
 Terence
 Bertie
 Trevor
 Harold
 The Fat Controller
 Stephen Hatt
 Mrs. Kyndley
 Jen Cole
 The Vicar of Wellsworth
 Lady Hatt (not named)
 Henrietta (does not speak)
 Bridget Hatt (cameo)

Notes

References

1991 British television seasons
1992 British television seasons
Thomas & Friends seasons